The Sunflower is a sour cocktail made with equal parts gin, elderflower, orange liquor like Cointreau and fresh lemon juice. It's served in a coupe glass that has been "rinsed" with absinthe. It is similar to the Corpse Reviver No. 2.

References

Cocktails with gin
Cocktails with triple sec or curaçao
Cocktails with lemon juice
Cocktails with absinthe
Sour cocktails